New Berlin Township is located in Sangamon County, Illinois. As of the 2010 census, its population was 1,524 and it contained 634 housing units. New Berlin Township was formed from a portion of Island Grove Township on March 3, 1869.

Geography

Demographics

References

External links
City-data.com
Illinois State Archives

The Township Hall is on South Cedar Street in New Berlin, IL.  The Township Supervisor is Joseph Fromme. The Road District Highway Commissioner is David Kemp.  The Township Clerk is Peggy Bloomfield.

Townships in Sangamon County, Illinois
Springfield metropolitan area, Illinois
Townships in Illinois